Sena (also Romanized as Senā; also known as Sāna, Shenā, and Sina) is a village in Shonbeh Rural District, Shonbeh and Tasuj District, Dashti County, Bushehr Province, Iran. At the 2006 census, its population was 1,251, in 262 families.

References 

Populated places in Dashti County